Joyce Boutique Holdings Limited (stylized as JOYCE) is a Hong Kong fashion retailer which is engaged in the franchise of fashion, accessories and cosmetics designer brands in Greater China under the name "JOYCE" or mono brand freestanding stores. It operates 40 points of sale across Greater China including five JOYCE multi-brand boutiques and over 10 JOYCE Beauty store concepts.

It was founded by Mrs. Joyce Ma in 1970. Its shares were listed on the Hong Kong Stock Exchange in 1990. In 2000, Wheelock and Company Limited acquired a 51% stake of JOYCE from the Ma  family, the largest shareholder. In 2003, Wheelock's shares were transferred to Mr. Peter Woo's family trust, and JOYCE Boutique became a member of the Lane Crawford JOYCE Group.

External links 

 Official website: https://www.joyce.com/

References

Companies listed on the Hong Kong Stock Exchange
Retail companies established in 1970
Clothing companies of Hong Kong
Clothing brands of Hong Kong
Wheelock and Company
Clothing retailers of Hong Kong
1970 establishments in Hong Kong